Richard Westmacott may refer to

 Richard Westmacott (the elder) (1747–1808), British monument sculptor
 Richard Westmacott (1775–1856), British sculptor
 Richard Westmacott (the younger) (1799–1872), British sculptor
 Richard Westmacott (Indian Army officer) (1841–1925), British military officer

See also
 Westmacott